On March 15, 2014, a crowd of Muslims burnt a Hindu temple and a dharmashala in Larkana, Sindh, Pakistan, after unverified allegations of a Hindu youth desecrating a copy of the Quran.

Background
According to police, few people saw burnt pages of Quran in a garbage bin near the home of Hindu man on the night of March 15. While there is another version which details the Hindu as tearing the Koran pages and throwing them down in the street. Immediately, a crowd of 200 had gathered outside the Hindu temple and attacked it. Also, the home of the Hindu youth who was accused of burning the book was surrounded, which prompted the security forces to fire warning shots and teargas shells. Police further confirmed that the desecrators were taken into custody and the temple is only partly gutted, whereas the dharmshala was completely burnt down. Shops were then burnt in the bazaar and transport services were suspended.

According to eyewitness accounts, policemen dressed the suspect Hindu in police uniform and whisked him away to safer location

Repercussions
In the southwestern province of Balochistan, police clashed with protesters angry at the blasphemy which resulted in injuries for two protestors and one policeman. In Osta Muhammad, four shops belonging to Hindus were set ablaze.

Further actions
Curfew was imposed in the Jinnah Bhag and some other parts of the city after mob ran berserk. Police took the Hindu into custody and if he was to be found guilty of burning Quran, he would be punished. Three people have been arrested for vandalism, while member each from Hindu and Muslim community will serve as the observers for investigation.

Local sources report that the alleged blasphemer had recently moved into house rented from Muslim family and had mistakenly burnt the book. As a result of tension related to this blasphemy accusation, Holi celebrations were called off in many locations for security purposes.

While additional contingents of police and rangers were deployed in the affected areas, pillion riding on bike has been banned.

Reactions
Muslim community leaders asserted that Islam does not allow for violence and claimed it as work of mischievous people. Hindu leaders said that if the suspect is guilty, then he should be punished.

Pakistan Prime Minister Nawaz Sharif has asked the Sindh Government to take steps to protect minorities and expressed profound grief on the incident.

Larkana's Hindu Panchyat President Kalpana Devi expressed her shock and sorrow over the incident. "I strongly condemn the desecration of the Holy Quran and demand the accused be punished if he really has committed [blasphemy]".

See also
 2019 Ghotki riots
 2020 Karak temple attack
 Persecution of Hindus in Pakistan

References

Blasphemy
Destruction of religious buildings and structures
Larkana District
Hindu temples in Pakistan
Religiously motivated violence in Pakistan
Crime in Sindh
Persecution by Muslims
March 2014 events in Pakistan
Anti-Hindu violence in Pakistan